The Guinea Pig EP is the first album released by the band Angry Salad. It was released in 1993 by Breaking World Records.

Track listing
 "Did I Hurt You?"
 "Given Up"
 "I Want You Back"
 "My Town"
 "So Little"
 "Dance"
 "Rico"

Personnel
 Bob Whelan: Guitar and Vocals
 Matt Foran: Bass Guitar and Backing Vocals
 Chris Davis: Guitar and Backing Vocals
 Hale Pulsifer: Drums

References

1993 EPs
Angry Salad albums